The list of ship commissionings in 1986 includes a chronological list of all ships commissioned in 1986.


References

See also 

1986
 Ship commissionings